Cabbage (キャベツビデヲ) is the debut release from Japanese band Super Junky Monkey. It is a live recording, and was originally released by an indie label on CD in 1994, and then released as a video later that year. It features a number of songs which would later be recorded on their debut album, Screw Up.

It was recorded on December 16, 1993.

CD track listing
 "Matador"
 "Super Junky Monkey Theme"
 "Revenge"
 "Find Your Self"
 "Shower"
 "Faster"
 "Popo Bar"
 "You Are Not The One"
 "Bed Side Session"

 Tracks 3,5, and 7 were later rerecorded for their debut album, Screw Up.

References

1994 live albums
Super Junky Monkey albums